Rashnudi may refer to: 
Rashnudi, Khuzestan
Rashnudi, Lorestan